Tiny Heroes is an iOS tower defense game developed by Simutronics Corp and released on September 8, 2011.

Critical reception

The game has a Metacritic score of 85/100 based on 13 critic reviews.

AppSafari said it was "A fun iPhone app to play and one I will definitely keep." TouchArcade said "I can't say enough about Tiny Heroes. It's a fantastic game, with few flaws to speak of. Challenging, but rarely frustrating, it had me returning to levels again and again to improve my score. By turning genre conventions on their heads, Tiny Heroes succeeds brilliantly." Slide To Play wrote "Though it has a few quirks, Tiny Heroes provides one of the best experiences in dungeon crawling this side of a Game Master's screen." AppGamer wrote "I cannot recommend Tiny Heroes enough, its brilliant art work and gameplay is supreme in the tower defence genre. The only thing missing is a sound track, but it's odd that while playing this superb game won't miss a sound track at all." GamePro wrote "Tiny Heroes is an excellent game, but with a few caveats: there's no iPad version (and this would be perfect for an iPad), placing traps/weapons precisely can be difficult, and sometimes the levels are just too hard." Level7.nu wrote "A fun tower defense-game, where you play as the bad guys, trying to stop the heroes from stealing your treasures by using monster, magic and traps." AppSpy said "With the glut of tower defense games on the App Store, it can be hard to stand out, but a decent premise backed up by solid gameplay can do wonders for making your mark."

AppSmile said "Mixing elements of Plants vs. Zombies with variable path mechanics and clever AI, Tiny Heroes brings frustratingly fun gameplay to a medieval setting." Wired said "Tiny Heroes draws its charm from all the chaos. There's always something to do; you'll constantly be throwing down new traps and replacing old ones at a frenetic pace. It's challenging and fun." 148Apps wrote "Fans of defense games and the geoDefense series will enjoy this." Gamezebo wrote "If you're a fan of tower defense games but have grown tired of the same ol' TD experience, Tiny Heroes delivers that something special you've been holding out for." Pocket Gamer said "Well produced and highly addictive, Tiny Heroes will find favour with fans of the genre – providing they don't expect anything startlingly original." tap! said "Sure, it's yet another tower defence game, but a surprisingly fresh and delightful one."

References

2011 video games
Android (operating system) games
IOS games
Tower defense video games
Video games developed in the United States